Saint-Hubert Air Base is a military airport located northeast of Saint-Hubert, a municipality in the province of Luxembourg in Wallonia (southern Belgium).

References

External links
 

Belgian airbases
Airports in Luxembourg (Belgium)
Saint-Hubert, Belgium